A Ronda may refer to:
 A Ronda (Boal), a parish in the municipality Boal, Asturias, Spain
 A Ronda (Eilao), a parish in the municipality Illano, Asturias, Spain

See also
 La Ronda (estate), a mansion and estate in Bryn Mawr, Pennsylvania